Power Inn is a side platformed Sacramento RT light rail station in the East Sacramento neighborhood of Sacramento, California, United States. The station was opened on September 5, 1987, and is operated by the Sacramento Regional Transit District. It is served by the Gold Line. The station is located near the intersection of Power Inn Road/Howe Avenue and Folsom Boulevard, adjacent to the U.S. 50 freeway and a major residential area, the station serves a commuter facility, via its park and ride lot.

Platforms and tracks

References

Sacramento Regional Transit light rail stations
Railway stations in the United States opened in 1987